The Bolshaya Kheta ("Great Kheta") is a river in Krasnoyarsk Krai, Russia. It is a left tributary of the Yenisey.

Course
The source of the Bolshaya Kheta is in Lake Yelovoy. It flows roughly northeastwards and joins the Yenisey northwest of Dudinka.

See also
List of rivers of Russia

References

External links
Fishing in Russia

Rivers of Krasnoyarsk Krai